Pseudonymous Bosch is the pen name of Raphael Simon (born October 25, 1967), the author of The Secret Series and The Bad Books series of fiction books, as well as The Unbelievable Oliver chapter book mysteries and two stand-alone titles. He has written 12 books, each widely read.

Personal life
Raphael Simon was born on October 25, 1967 to writers Dyanne Asimow and Roger L. Simon. He was born in Los Angeles County, California. His brother, Jesse, is a visual artist. He also has significantly younger half-sister, Madeleine, from his father's third marriage.

Simon attended Yale, where he came out as gay when he was 20 years old. Later he earned an MA in Comparative Literature from UC Irvine. He currently lives in Pasadena, California with his husband, Phillip de Leon. They have twin children, who were born in 2007.

Professional career

Bosch had long been suspected to be the author Raphael Simon, although Bosch disputed this until he revealed himself as Simon in a May 8, 2016, editorial in The New York Times.

The pseudonym plays off that of the artist Hieronymus Bosch.  It also may play off the fictional Los Angeles detective, Hieronymous "Harry" Bosch, also named after the artist, created by the author Michael Connelly, and who has appeared in several of his novels starting in 1992.

Prior to becoming a novelist, Simon worked as a screenwriter, including as a staff writer on the Nickelodeon series Rocket Power. He started writing his first novel, The Name of this Book Is Secret, as a series of letters to a fourth-grader. It was published in 2007, and was nominated for an Edgar Allan Poe award for best juvenile mystery. A sequel followed in 2008: If You're Reading This It's Too Late. Eventually there would be five titles in the Secret Series. The New York Times bestselling series has sold millions of copies and has been translated into many languages.

In 2013, Bosch published Write This Book!, a do it yourself book; he calls it "a book that readers will write for me". Bosch elaborated in an interview with Wired stating that "it is a kind of half-written, guided mystery. Parts of it are going to be multiple choice, choose-your-own adventure, parts of it will be more like Mad Libs, and some silly stuff". 

The following year, Bosch returned readers to the world of the Secret Series in Bad Magic, the first novel in what became the Bad Books trillogy.

On May 14, 2019, Bosch published The Unbelievable Oliver and the Four Jokers, with illustrations by Shane Pangburn. The book is about an eight year-old boy who longs to be a professional magician. A followup, The Unbelievable Oliver and the Sawed-in-Half Dads, was released on May 12, 2020.

In 2021, Bosch published The Anti-Book, his first book under his real name Rapheal Simon.

Bibliography

As Pseudonymous Bosch

The Secret Series

The Name of This Book is Secret (October 1, 2007)
If You're Reading This it's Too Late (October 1, 2008)
This Book Is Not Good for You (September 1, 2009)
This Isn't What It Looks Like (September 21, 2010)
You Have to Stop This (September 20, 2011)

The Bad Books
Bad Magic (2014) centers around a character who was first introduced as Max-Ernest's little brother, Paul-Clay, in the Secret Series.
Bad Luck (2016)
Bad News (January 2017)

The Unbelievable Oliver
The Unbelievable Oliver and the Four Jokers (2019, illustrated by Shane Pangburn)
The Unbelievable Oliver and the Sawed in Half Dads (2020, illustrated by Shane Pangburn)

Standalone
Write This Book (2013) is a do-it-yourself mystery.

As Raphael Simon

The Anti-Book (2021)

Notes

References

Citations

Sources

External links

 
 Pseudonymous Bosch and 
 Works by or about Pseudonymous Bosch and 

Living people
American children's writers
American gay writers
21st-century pseudonymous writers
1967 births